Koblenz-Winningen Airport is a regional airport in Germany .  It supports general aviation with no commercial airline service scheduled.

History
The airfield was used by the United States Army Air Forces  during World War II by IX Air Support Command, Ninth Air Force as a Supply and Evacuation/ Emergency Landing Airfield during March–May 1945.

References
 Johnson, David C. (1988), U.S. Army Air Forces Continental Airfields (ETO), D-Day to V-E Day; Research Division, USAF Historical Research Center, Maxwell AFB, Alabama.

External links
 http://flugplatz-koblenz-winningen.de

Airports in Rhineland-Palatinate
Koblenz